The women's 69 kg competition of the weightlifting events at the 2015 Pan American Games in Toronto, Canada, was held on July 14 at the Oshawa Sports Centre. The defending champion was Mercedes Pérez from Colombia.

Schedule
All times are Eastern Daylight Time (UTC-4).

Results
10 athletes from nine countries took part.

References

External links
Weightlifting schedule

Weightlifting at the 2015 Pan American Games
Pan
Wei